Strigula is a genus of lichen-forming fungi in the family Strigulaceae. The genus was circumscribed in 1823 by English mycologist Elias Magnus Fries.

Species
Strigula acuticonidiarum 
Strigula affinis 
Strigula albicascens 
Strigula albolinita 
Strigula amphora 
Strigula angustata 
Strigula antillarum 
Strigula australiensis 
Strigula austropunctata 
Strigula bella 
Strigula bermudana 
Strigula bispora 
Strigula brevis 
Strigula caerulensis 
Strigula cavicola 
Strigula concreta 
Strigula confusa 
Strigula decipiens  – Australia
Strigula dichosporidii 
Strigula elixii 
Strigula endolithea 
Strigula fossulicola 
Strigula fossulicoloides 
Strigula fractans  – Australia
Strigula glabra 
Strigula guangdongensis  – China
Strigula guangxiensis 
Strigula indutula 
Strigula intermedia  – China
Strigula janeirensis 
Strigula lacericola 
Strigula laevis  – China
Strigula laureriformis 
Strigula lobulosa 
Strigula macrocarpa 
Strigula maculata 
Strigula melanobapha 
Strigula microcarpa  – China
Strigula minor 
Strigula minuta 
Strigula minutula 
Strigula multipunctata 
Strigula muriconidiata 
Strigula muriformis 
Strigula muscicola 
Strigula natalis 
Strigula nemathora 
Strigula nigrocarpa 
Strigula nitidula 
Strigula novae-zelandiae 
Strigula obducta 
Strigula obtecta 
Strigula oceanica 
Strigula orbicularis 
Strigula phaea 
Strigula phyllogena 
Strigula platypoda 
Strigula prasina 
Strigula pseudoantillarum  – China
Strigula pseudosubtilissima  – China
Strigula pycnoradians  – Thailand
Strigula radiata 
Strigula rhodinula 
Strigula rupestris  – Australia
Strigula schizospora 
Strigula sinoaustralis 
Strigula sinoconcreta  – China
Strigula smaragdula 
Strigula stenoloba  – China
Strigula stigmatella 
Strigula subelegans 
Strigula submuriformis 
Strigula subprospersella 
Strigula subtilissima 
Strigula subtilissimoides  – China
Strigula tagananae 
Strigula taylorii 
Strigula thelopsidoides 
Strigula transversoundulata 
Strigula viridiseda 
Strigula wandae 
Strigula ziziphi

References

Dothideomycetes
Dothideomycetes genera
Lichen genera
Taxa named by Elias Magnus Fries
Taxa described in 1823